The Indian hare (Lepus nigricollis), also known as the black-naped hare, is a common species of hare native to the Indian subcontinent, and Java.

Introductions
It has been introduced to Madagascar, Comoro Islands, Andaman Islands, Irian Jaya, Papua New Guinea, Seychelles, Mayotte, Mauritius and Réunion.

Taxonomy
There are 7 recognized subspecies of Indian hare.
 Lepus nigricollis aryabertensis
 Lepus nigricollis dayanus
 Lepus nigricollis nigricollis
 Lepus nigricollis ruficaudatus
 Lepus nigricollis sadiya
 Lepus nigricollis simcoxi
 Lepus nigricollis singhala

References

Indian hare
Mammals of South Asia
Mammals of India
Indian hare
Indian hare